Elizabeth T. Daly (October 15, 1878 – September 2, 1967) was an American writer of mystery novels whose main character, Henry Gamadge, was a bookish author, bibliophile, and amateur detective. A writer of light verse and prose for Life, Puck, and Scribner's magazines in her earlier years, Daly published her first Gamadge novel, Unexpected Night, at age 60. Between 1940 and 1951, she published 16 novels featuring Gamadge.

Her career included two years as a reader at Bryn Mawr College, 1904–06. At other times, she tutored in French and English, and she was a producer of amateur theater.

Personal life
Born Elizabeth T. Daly in 1878 in New York City, she was the daughter of Joseph F. Daly, a New York Supreme Court justice, and Emma Barker Daly. She graduated from Bryn Mawr College with a B.A. in 1901 and from Columbia University with an M.A. in 1902. Daly was an honorary member of the Mystery Writers of America. She died in Roslyn, New York, in 1967 at age 88.

Critical reception
Charles Shibuk, in St. James Guide to Crime and Mystery Writers, said that Daly was Agatha Christie's favorite American mystery writer. Daly successfully used many of the literary conventions employed by Christie and other writers of the Golden Age of Detective Fiction, he said, and "was always both civilized and literate". The Mystery Writers of America, referring to her as "the grande dame of women mystery writers", awarded her a "Special Edgar" in 1961.

Bibliography

Henry Gamadge novels
 Unexpected Night (1940)
 Deadly Nightshade (1940)
 Murders in Volume 2 (1941)
 The House Without the Door (1942)
 Evidence of Things Seen (1943)
 Nothing Can Rescue Me (1943)
 Arrow Pointing Nowhere (1944) (Also published as Murder Listens In) 
 The Book of the Dead (1944)
 Any Shape or Form (1945)
 Somewhere in the House (1946)
 The Wrong Way Down (1946)
 Night Walk (1947)
 The Book of the Lion (1948) 
 And Dangerous to Know (1949) 
 The Book of Crime (1951)
 Death and Letters (1953) 
 An Elizabeth Daly Mystery Omnibus: Three Henry Gamadge Novels (includes Murders in Volume 2, Evidence of Things Seen, and The Book of the Dead) (1960)

Other
The Street Has Changed (1941)

References

External links
 

1878 births
1967 deaths
20th-century American women writers
American crime fiction writers